John Jameson (1751 – 20 November 1810) was an American soldier, most notable for his service during the American Revolutionary War. He was of Scottish descent and was a resident of Culpeper, Virginia and belonged to a distinguished Jameson Virginian family.

Early life
John Jameson was a graduate of The College of William and Mary, Williamsburg, Virginia, the second oldest college in the country.

Colonel John Jameson’s uncle was Lieutenant Governor David Jameson of Yorktown, Virginia who served from 1780-81 under the Governorship of Thomas Nelson Jr., signor of the United States Declaration of Independence and served as Governor briefly in August 1781 when Nelson took ill. He was elected as a State Senator in 1783. He also served in the Senate during the War in 1776-1777, serving on Patrick Henry's Privy Council. His great nephew John Jameson served as a congressman for Missouri 1839-1849.

American Revolution

In Culpeper, Virginia (what was then called Fairfax, Virginia) under an old Oak tree during the spring of 1775, he volunteered with other men from Culpeper, Orange and Fauquier counties forming the Culpeper Minutemen. He was a Captain and company commander in the Culpeper Minutemen battalion. Making use of popular symbols and phrases of the period, the battalion's flag featured an obverse field containing an emblem of a snake (a symbol of the colonies) and the American Revolutionary mottoes "Liberty or Death" and "Don't Tread on Me."

Jameson and John Marshall were a leading spirit amongst the famous Culpeper minute-men. These were the first soldiers raised in Virginia. Together, he and the Minutemen fought in the Battle of Great Bridge, the first Revolutionary War battle on Virginia soil, where the minutemen defeated British troops under John Murray, 4th Earl of Dunmore, temporarily ending British control of Virginia.

Jameson was elected June 13, 1776, by the Virginia Convention, captain of the Third Troop of Horse. He had six competitors for the position, and received forty-eight vote, while his competitors received respectively 17, 15, 9, 4, 3, 2 votes. One of his competitors was Henry Lee. Jameson took command June 16, 1776 as captain in a Virginia regiment of dragoons; promoted March 31, 1777, major 1st Continental Light Dragoons, and transferred April 7, 1777, to 3rd Continental Light Dragoons. He fought at the Battle of Brandywine. While staying with George Washington at Valley Forge, Major Jameson was wounded in a skirmish nearby on January 21, 1778. Throughout that year and the next he remained at Washington's side, engaged at the Battle of Monmouth, New Jersey in June, and promoted to Colonel in August 1779.

As a Colonel in the Continental Army during the American Revolutionary War he was instrumental in exposing the treason of Benedict Arnold. In 1780, General George Washington placed key commanders in strategic areas around West Point, New York, and Colonel Jameson was placed in Tarrytown, New York under the supervision of General Benedict Arnold. A man calling himself "John Anderson" was intercepted by militiamen and found to be in possession of documents that included information regarding the defenses of West Point and the movements of the American army. Since the papers were found in an odd place, "under the feet of his stockings", Colonel Jameson became alarmed, arrested Anderson, and alerted General Arnold, since he did not yet suspect Arnold. Anderson was carrying a pass signed by the General, and Arnold was noted to be "very desirous of the Papers and everything being sent with him." Jameson followed orders and had sent Anderson and the papers but was dissuaded by Major Benjamin Tallmadge, head of Continental Army Intelligence, who had just arrived at the headquarters.

Because of the serious nature of the papers Jameson wrote to General Washington, enclosing the papers taken from Anderson. However he still insisted on notifying Arnold who promptly fled. Upon examining the papers, Washington called for Anderson, who then confessed that he was British major John André, envoy to the British commander in chief, Sir Henry Clinton. The investigation further revealed that Benedict Arnold, as commandant of West Point, agreed in 1780 to surrender the fort to the enemy in return for a royal commission in the British army and a large sum of money. Because of Jameson's intuition, Arnold's plot was foiled, but on balance, his misjudgment also allowed Arnold to escape. In any case, the attempt to pass control of West Point to the British was thwarted.

Later life
Jameson was a member of the Society of the Cincinnati, in Virginia, and was present at their meeting held December 13, 1802, in Richmond, Virginia, when it was voted to appropriate some of their funds, to the amount of $25,000, to found Washington College in Maryland.

Personal life
He was described as being 6 feet tall, blue-eyed and fair-complexion with black hair. He owned many thousands acres of land throughout Virginia, Ohio, and Kentucky.

Jameson was a member at the Freemasonry chapter in Alexandria, Virginia. He died on 20 November 1810 and was buried at the Culpeper Masonic Cemetery in Culpeper, Virginia.

References

External links
History of Culpeper, VA

 

1751 births
1810 deaths
Continental Army officers from Virginia
People from Culpeper, Virginia